Dingcheng District is one of two urban districts in Changde City, Hunan Province, China; it is also the 2nd most populous district (after Heshan District) in Hunan. The district is bordered to the north by Anxiang County, Jinshi City and Linli County, to the west by Taoyuan County, to the north by Anhua and Taojiang Counties, to the east by Hanshou County, Wuling District is in the central west of Dingcheng District. It is divided into four subdistricts, 19 towns and one township, its government seat is Hongyun Subdistrict.

Administrative divisions
According to the result on adjustment of township-level administrative divisions of Dingcheng District on November 23, 2015, Dingcheng District has four subdistricts, 19 towns and one township under its jurisdiction. they are:

4 Subdistricts
 Yuxia Subdistrict
 Hongyun Subdistrict
 Guojiapu
 Doumuhu

19 Towns
 Haozigang
 Shimeitang
 Zhonghekou
 Niubitan
 Hangongdu
 Zhoujiadian
 Shigongqiao
 Zhendeqiao
 Shibantan
 Caijiagang
 Guanxitan
 Shuangqiaoping
 Xiejiapu
 Caoping, Changde
 Huangtudian
 Huayanxi
 Yaotianping
 Shimenqiao
 Zhufeng

1 Township
 Xujiaqiao

References

External links

 
County-level divisions of Hunan
Changde